Orthohepevirus is a genus of viruses assigned to the family Hepeviridae. Orthohepevirus is a fairly isolated viral genus in which the virions are characterized by round, non-enveloped and isometric capsids with a diameter of 27–34 nm. The hepatitis E virus belongs this genus as the species Orthohepevirus A

Genome
Orthohepeviruses have RNA genomes of 7176 nucleotides in length and infect vertebrates. Additionally, the genome is monopartite, linear, and single-stranded. The genome is 5' capped with a poly A tail at the 3' end. The genome possesses three main open reading frames. The first encodes non-structural proteins, the second encodes the capsid proteins, and the third encodes a small, multifunctional protein.

Taxonomy
Viruses from this genus have been isolated from a variety of mammals (including rodents, mustelids and bats) as well as birds. At least three variants of avian hepatitis E virus have been isolated from birds.

A Hepatitis E-like virus has been isolated from a Swedish moose. This virus is quite distinct from the other known Hepatitis E viruses.

In total, the genus has four recognized species: Orthohepevirus A, Orthohepevirus B, which was previously known as the avian hepatitis E virus, Orthohepevirus C, and Orthohepevirus D.

History
Hepatitis E was first isolated in 1990. It was thought to be restricted to humans until 1997 when it was isolated from pigs. The first isolation from birds was in 2001.

Evolution
One study has suggested that this species may have originated in birds and then spread to bats and other mammalian species.

References

External links
 ICTV Online (10th) Report Hepeviridae
 Viralzone: Hepevirus

Hepeviridae
Virus genera